Urqu Jawira (Aymara urqu male, jawira river, "male river", Hispanicized spellings Orkojahuira, Orkojawira) is a river in Bolivia in the La Paz Department, Pedro Domingo Murillo Province. It originates in the Wayllari mountain range. On its way to Choqueyapu River it crosses the city La Paz from north to south in the Putu Putu or Miraflores district.

See also

List of rivers of Bolivia

References

Rivers of La Paz Department (Bolivia)